Diaphania interpositalis is a moth in the family Crambidae. It was described by George Hampson in 1912. It is found in the Brazilian states of Santa Catarina, Paraná and São Paulo.

The length of the forewings is 11-11.5 mm for males and 9–11 mm for females. The costal and terminal bands on the forewings are light brown. The hindwings are almost white, with only a few yellow scales on the apex.

References

Moths described in 1912
Diaphania